Kunyangella is genus of Cambrian arthropod known for being a member of the Chengjiang biota, containing the single species K. cheni. It has a bivalved carapace and has tentatively been referred to the Bradoriida.

See also

 Arthropod
 Cambrian explosion
 Chengjiang biota
 List of Chengjiang Biota species by phylum

References

Cambrian animals
Maotianshan shales fossils
Prehistoric arthropod genera

Cambrian genus extinctions